Linda Medalen (born 17 June 1965) is a former Norwegian footballer. She is one of Norway's most celebrated former footballers, finishing her international career with 152 caps, scoring 64 goals. She was on the Norway team that won the 1995 FIFA Women's World Cup.

She played most of her career in Norway with Asker Fotball, and retired in 2006, at 41 years old. She also spent seven seasons in Japan with Nikko. She started her career as a striker, but as her career progressed, she moved further back on the field, and was playing toward the end of her career in central defence.

Apart from playing football, Medalen worked as a police officer. In 2007, she was elected to serve as a local politician in Asker municipality council for the Conservative Party. Medalen is openly lesbian, coming out in a Se og Hør article in June 1999. On 16 June 2012, Medalen married Trude Flan.

Club career
In August 2000 Medalen revealed that she was considering an approach from the Women's United Soccer Association (WUSA), following contact from the nascent American professional league's vice president of playing personnel Lauren Gregg.

Medalen was sent-off at half-time in the 2001 Norwegian Women's Cup final, for slapping away Gøril Kringen's hand during a disagreement. The disappointment from Asker's 3–2 defeat was compounded as the final was intended to be Medalen's farewell appearance before her retirement from football. In the 2003 Toppserien Medalen returned to Asker as a player-coach. In 2006 41-year-old Medalen made another playing comeback and was selected for Asker's 3–2 Norwegian Women's Cup final defeat by Røa IL.

International career
Medalen made her debut for the Norway women's national football team on 7 October 1987, in a 1–0 1989 European Competition for Women's Football qualifying defeat by Denmark women's national football team at the Ullevaal Stadion.

At the 1988 FIFA Women's Invitation Tournament, Medalen scored her first two national team goals in her fourth appearance; Norway's opening 4–0 win over Thailand in Jiangmen. She scored again in a 3–0 win over Australia, then scored the only goal in the final win over Sweden at the Tianhe Stadium in Guangzhou. Medalen was named to the tournament All-Star team.

Norway rebounded from their qualifying defeat by Denmark to qualify for the 1989 European Competition for Women's Football tournament. Medalen's first-minute goal in the 2–1 semi-final win over Sweden helped set up a final meeting with the West German hosts in Osnabrück, but reigning European champions Norway were beaten 4–1.

At UEFA Women's Euro 1991, Medalen's Norway reached the final again but were beaten by Germany, this time 3–1 after extra-time. This placing secured qualification for the inaugural 1991 FIFA Women's World Cup in China. Medalen scored six goals, including two in the semi-final win over Sweden and an equaliser in the 2–1 final defeat by the United States. She was awarded FIFA's "Bronze Ball" as the tournament's third best player.

In Norway's opening UEFA Women's Euro 1993 qualifying fixture, Medalen scored four times in a 10–0 win over Switzerland. At the UEFA Women's Euro 1993 final tournament Norway recaptured their European title, beating hosts Italy 1–0 in the final. In UEFA Women's Euro 1995 Norway missed out on a fifth successive final appearance, being eliminated in the semi-finals by Sweden, 7–5 on aggregate, despite Medalen's second-leg goal in Jönköping.

Medalen was an important player in the Norway team which won the 1995 FIFA Women's World Cup in Sweden.

At the 1999 FIFA Women's World Cup in the United States, Medalen was Norway's captain. She also had a new role as a central defender, having struggled to adapt to incoming coach Per-Mathias Høgmo's possession-based tactics for his forwards.

Medalen felt she had sufficiently recovered from a ligament injury to participate at the 2000 Summer Olympics. She was disappointed when Høgmo disagreed and left her out. She was also disappointed at the withdrawal of her Norwegian Football Federation central contract worth 3500kr per month: "it was like getting a knife in the back".

International goals

Personal life
Medalen came out as a lesbian in an interview with the Se og Hør gossip magazine in 1999, declaring: "I love a girl, it's not worse". She brought her partner Kristin Bitnes to that year's FIFA Women's World Cup in the United States, but the couple separated after eight years together in 2006. Medalen was part of an exceptionally strong Norwegian women's football selection at the 2002 Gay Games in Sydney. Medalen met dance instructor Trude Flan in 2010 and the two were married two years later. Medalen announced their separation in January 2022.

In 1997 Medalen posed with a carefully-positioned football for semi-nude photographs in Se og Hør. It has been reported as evidence of sexism that Medalen earned 70000kr for the photographs but stood to earn only 27500kr if she had won that year's UEFA Women's Championship with Norway. Her cousin Rune Medalen played football for Tippeligaen clubs Bryne FK and Viking FK.

In 2020 Medalen participated in the "Mesternes mester" reality television programme, screened on NRK. In 2011 she had appeared in another reality television series, 71 Degrees North. TVNorge apologised to Medalen after broadcasting images of her topless without her consent.

During her football career, Medalen was relatively outspoken. She enjoyed Norway's rivalry with the United States team, frequently exchanging "trash-talk" with her friend Michelle Akers. While her habit of scoring important goals against neighbours Sweden saw Medalen ruefully nicknamed "Svenskdöderskan" in Sweden.

Honours

Club
Asker
Toppserien: 1988, 1991, 1998, 1999
Norwegian Women's Cup: 1990, 1991, 2000

Nikko
L. League: 1996, 1997, 1998
Empress's Cup: 1992, 1996

International
Norway
FIFA Women's World Cup: 1995
UEFA Women's Championship: 1993

References

External links
 
 Linda Medalen at the Norwegian Football Federation (NFF) 

1965 births
Living people
Place of birth missing (living people)
1991 FIFA Women's World Cup players
1995 FIFA Women's World Cup players
1999 FIFA Women's World Cup players
Asker politicians
Conservative Party (Norway) politicians
Women police officers
FIFA Century Club
Footballers at the 1996 Summer Olympics
Lesbian sportswomen
LGBT association football players
LGBT law enforcement workers
Norwegian LGBT sportspeople
Norwegian lesbians
Olympic bronze medalists for Norway
Olympic footballers of Norway
Olympic medalists in football
Norway women's international footballers
Norwegian expatriate sportspeople in Japan
Norwegian expatriate women's footballers
Norwegian women's footballers
Norwegian police officers
Norwegian sportsperson-politicians
FIFA Women's World Cup-winning players
Nikko Securities Dream Ladies players
Expatriate women's footballers in Japan
Nadeshiko League players
Asker Fotball (women) players
Klepp IL players
Toppserien players
People from Sandnes
Medalists at the 1996 Summer Olympics
Women's association football forwards
UEFA Women's Championship-winning players
Nadeshiko League MVPs